Xu Song, English name "Vae", is an independent Chinese musician in pop music. He was born in Hefei, Anhui Province, on 14 May 1986.

Developments

Internet experiences (2006–2008)

In 2006 
As a sophomore in Anhui Medical University, Vae made some demos with his personal computer and microphone in his spare time. Some of the songs are adaptions of some famous singers, such as Jay Chou, and others are written by him and a friend. After he put these demos on the Internet with the name of "Vae", a growing number of people began to know him as a singer.

From 2007 to 2008 
Vae kept writing and uploading at least one song per month. "The Funeral of Rose" is one of those songs in that term, sung by Vae and Li Yijie. At that time, Vae did not give up imitating other famous singers, so this song really sounds like one of Jay's song, "The Song of Night" especially at the beginning of the song. It describes a young man missing his dead girlfriend, which also follows Jay's plot. "If You Become the Wind" is another, which is about a young man's desire for a girl to be his girlfriend.

Vae refused all performance invitations in order not to affect his concentration on his academic studies. His songs and life choices engendered a lot of praise and attracted more of an audience. In 2005, Vae got the award as Chinese entertainment NET best male singer. In May 2007, Vae got the chance to be the member of the Anhui Musician's Association. One year later, he became one of the best 10 students in all of Anhui Province.

In the past three years, Vae changed from just a music player to a professional popular musician. What's more, he was not only a traditional Internet singer, but he also became someone who actually improved the level of Internet specific performances.

Though Vae was really popular on the Internet, no one could really tell where this fame would take him in 2008.

Independent success (2009–2010) 
After graduating from college, Vae spent about half a year preparing his first personal CD. Jan 10th, 2009 a CD named Personalize came out. Vae did all of the work personally, including composing, writing, recording and so on. Even the paper used in the package was chosen by him. The CD has nine songs, including "Why Not", "Bad Kid", "Shrewdness", "Excessive Explanations" plus others. Most of which the songs are considered blues.

The CD was sold in advance from 11 Dec 2008 to 21 Dec 2008 and the number of sales broke 10,000 in just ten days. The CD had no commercial promotion outside of the internet community of fans. This attracted several musical companies, however, no company would publish his independent CD because of his requirements.

So, Vae passed on all companies and began to prepare his second CD Sought and Got, which came out on January 6, 2010 and became another big success. There are nine songs in this CD, including "Luzhou Moon", "The White Horse Is Not A Horse".

"I Don't Care", "Single Journey". One day after the CD being uploaded on the Internet, it became the most popular one in QQ music taking the place of Jay Chou, who had been on top for more than seven years.

In addition, Vae also composed a lot of other songs during this time. "Two Tragedies" is one of them, telling a young man's mood after breaking off with his girlfriend. "Your Mouth" is a song Vae composed for a female singer, Jin Sha, who was in the same music company with Vae. But by then, Vae had become a musical legend all on his own.

2011–present 
In March 2011 Vae finally got into an international musical company, Ocean Butterflies. This time, the rules were changed for him so that Vae was allowed to complete his third CD, as before, while the company would be only in charge of promotion, which never happened to any other singers.

The CD "Socra Without 'tes" was published on 1 Apr 2011. Ten songs in this CD talk about philosophy in everyday life and love, such as "Imagination" and "Doctors". The number of viewers reached one million within one day after one single's release.

After the publication, Vae started his traveling around the country to take part in the activities with fans. Beijing, Shanghai, Hefei, Nanjing are all included. Besides, Vae began to get in some commercial activities. He has been one of the spokesmen of an online game "天龙八部", which had been adapted from Jin Yong's novel.

On the Internet, there is a saying that Ocean Butterflies has saved a big fortune by promoting a new singer because Vae is not a new guy. He has been popular on his own. In July 2012, Xu Song published his 4th album Travelling in the dream.

In 2016, Vae released his 6th album, Youth Evening Paper, received with critical acclaim, currently holding 7.0 on Douban, the Chinese equivalent of IMDB and Rotten Tomatoes, with 717 critics. 
In his recent interview with Sina News, he states he is currently single.

Albums

(2009)
Pure Music and Love V Absolutely! (音乐纯粹, 爱v绝对)  ——a V-fan yht
Publisher: Anhui Audio and Video Publishing House
Music Copyright: Vae (Yang Haitao) 
Producer: Vae (Xu Song)
Taping/Sound Mixing/Mastering: Vae (Xu Song) @Vae Studio
Photograph/Graphic Design: Peng Huan (Milk Photograph) /(22° Vision) 
Songs：
"If at that Time"
"Excessive Explanations"
"Why Not"
"Bad Kid"
"Rain in Ching Ming Day"
"Shrewdness"
"Confessing"
"Spy"
"On the Constellation Book"

(2010)
Publisher: Anhui Electronic Audio and Video Publishing House
Music Copyrightist: Vae (Xu Song) 
Composing/Writing: Vae (Xu Song) 
Photograph/Graphic Design: Peng Huan (Milk Photograph) 
Songs：
"Admiration"
"Grey Head Portrait"
"I Don't Care"
"Luzhou Moon"
"Not Sensational"
"Love Is A Terrible Waste of Lives"
"The White Horse Is Not A Horse"
"Single Journey"
"A not Far Away Place"

(2011)
Publisher: Jiuzhou Audio and Video Publishing House 
Producer: Du Daning/Lu Jian/Bi Xiaoshi 
Exclusive Distribution: Ocean Butterflies International Pte Ltd. 
Songs: 
"Imagination"
"Wonderful Place"
"Rob Peter To Pay Paul"
"Doctors"
"Complex About Micro Blog"
"Harm"
"Beside You"
"Beijing Rain"
"No Drinking"
"How Many Times"

(2012)
Publisher: Jiuzhou Audio and Video Publishing House 
Producer: Du Daning/Lu Jian/Bi Xiaoshi 
Exclusive Distribution: Ocean Butterflies International Pte Ltd. 
Songs: 
"Carrots"
"Hearing"
"Mr. Talk"
"With A Tiger"
"Best Friend"
"Idiotic"
"Play With Style"
"Your Past Hurts"
"Global Cooling"
"Love Style"

(2014) 
Publisher: Jiuzhou Audio and Video Publishing House 
Producer: Du Daning/Lu Jian/Bi Xiaoshi 
Exclusive Distribution: Ocean Butterflies International Pte Ltd. 
Songs:
 "As Fire Sets"
 "Between the Mountains"
 "Seventh Moon"
 "Flowers"
 "Surprise"
 "Quietly"
 "Universe"
 "Oaken Lamps"
 "Suddenly"

(2016) 
Publisher: Jiuzhou Audio and Video Publishing House 
Producer: Du Daning/Lu Jian/Bi Xiaoshi 
Exclusive Distribution: Ocean Butterflies International Pte Ltd. 
Songs:
 "Stranger Stories"
 "Acquired Taste"
 "Best Singer"
 "Imaginary"
 "Photographic Art"
 "Parallel Universe"
 "As The Swallows Return"
 "Away"
 "Sleep Early"

(2018) 
Publisher: Jiuzhou Audio and Video Publishing House 
Producer: Du Daning/Lu Jian/Bi Xiaoshi 
Exclusive Distribution: Ocean Butterflies International Pte Ltd. 
Songs:
 "Antique"
 "Boundless Universe"
 "Artists"
 "An Early Morning In September"
 "Surging"
 "Repeat"
 "Wise Move"
 "A Matter Of Time"
 "Let Nature Take Its Course"

References

Vae's Blog
Musical Man

External links
Official website

1986 births
Chinese pop singers
Living people
People from Hefei
Musicians from Anhui
Singers from Anhui
Chinese male singer-songwriters
21st-century Chinese male singers